The Army Command College of the Chinese People's Liberation Army is an educational institution administered by the People's Liberation Army of the People's Republic of China, based in the city of Nanjing. It serves as a command academy that trains army commanders in the PLA Ground Forces. The college is among the most esteemed military academies in China. Since 1957, it has undertaken the task of providing long-term military training to foreign officers.

History 
The college traces its history back to the East China Military and Political University, which was abolished on November 28, 1950. On January 27, 1974, the Nanjing Military Region decided to build a Military and Political Cadre School based in the Pukou District. The opening ceremony was held on April 19, 1976. In January 1978, the Central Military Commission ordered the Nanjing Military Region Military and Political Cadre School to be upgraded and transformed into the Nanjing Advanced Infantry School. In December 1980, it was renamed the Nanjing Advanced Army School.

In July 1986, it was renamed the PLA Army Command Academy. In 1999, it was renamed the Nanjing Army Command College, being a key construction academy in the third phase of the "2110 Project" of military academies. In 2016, the school was transferred from the PLA General Staff Department to the PLAGF. The following year, in connection with the reforms of 2015, the school was renamed to the Army Command College.

Students 
The college is known to host exchange students from foreign countries such as Azerbaijan, The Gambia, South Korea and Pakistan. The college oversees the International Military Education Exchange Center (IMEEC).

Notable alumni 
 Fan Changmi, Deputy Political Commissar of the Lanzhou Military Region until he was placed under investigation for corruption in 2014.
Hikmat Hasanov, commander of the 1st Army Corps (Azerbaijan)

See also 

 List of government-run higher-level national military academies
 Army Medical University

References 

People's Liberation Army
Educational institutions established in 2017
Military education and training in China
2017 establishments in China
People's Liberation Army Nanjing Military Command College
Universities and colleges in Nanjing